The 1974 Trans-AMA motocross series was the fifth annual international series established by the American Motorcyclist Association as a pilot event to help establish motocross in the United States. The motocross series was an invitational based on a 500cc engine displacement formula, run on American tracks featuring the top riders from the F.I.M. world championship against the top American riders.

Suzuki factory rider Roger De Coster claimed the championship with four overall victories. His Suzuki teammate, Dutchman Gerrit Wolsink took second place along with one overall victory. Maico factory rider Adolf Weil claimed third place, while the top American rider was Bultaco's Jim Pomeroy in fourth place.

1974 Trans-AMA final standings

1974 Trans-AMA Round 1 
Oct. 6, 1974, Unadilla, New York

1974 Trans-AMA Round 2 
Oct. 13, 1974, Linnville, Ohio

1974 Trans-AMA Round 3 
Oct. 20, 1974, Gainesville, Georgia

1974 Trans-AMA Round 4 
Oct. 27, 1974, Orlando, Florida

1974 Trans-AMA Round 5 
Nov. 10, 1974, Whitney, Texas

1974 Trans-AMA Round 6 
Nov. 17, 1974, Puyallup, Washington

1974 Trans-AMA Round 7 
Nov. 24, 1974, Livermore, California

1974 Trans-AMA Round 8 
Dec. 1, 1974, Saddleback, California

See also
 1974 FIM Motocross World Championship
 1974 AMA Motocross National Championship season

External links
 American Motorcyclist, January 1975, Vol. 29, No. 1, ISSN 0277-9358
 American Motorcyclist, February 1975, Vol. 29, No. 2, ISSN 0277-9358
 American Motorcyclist, February 1982, Vol. 36, No. 2, ISSN 0277-9358

References

Trans-AMA
Trans-AMA
Trans-AMA motocross series
1974 in American motorsport
Trans-AMA